Composite index may refer to:
 Composite (finance), in finance
 Composite index (database), an index involving multiple columns